Trinidad and Tobago is located in the Atlantic Time Zone (UTC−04:00). The twin island nation does not observe daylight saving time.

IANA time zone database
In the IANA time zone database Trinidad and Tobago has the following time zone:
 America/Port_of_Spain

References 

Time zones
Trinidad and Tobago